Bares is a surname. Notable people with the surname include:

 (1936–2008), American lawyer and politician
Gabriel Barès (born 2000), Swiss professional footballer 
Jakub Bareš (born 1988), Czech curler from Prague
Jeannine Cavender-Bares, American professor
Joseph Barès (1872–1954), French general and a pioneer of military aviation
Louis Barès (born 1930), French racing cyclist
Peter Bares (1936–2014), German organist and composer
Raymond H. Bares (1929-1964), American educator and politician
Vojtěch Bareš (born 1974), Czech slalom canoeist

See also
Bare (disambiguation)
Barer